Darwin Breaux (born May 8, 1955) is an American football, golf, and wrestling coach.

Biography
Breaux is the head men's golf coach at Dickinson College, a position he has held since 2000. He served as the head football coach at Dickinson from 1993 to 2016, and was the thirty-fourth person to take that post; several coaches have held the post twice. 

Breaux joined the Dickinson football staff in 1989 as offensive coordinator and took over the head coaching position in 1993. His 1994 team put together a school record 10–0 regular season and earned an NCAA Playoff appearance and was named the AFCA South Region Coach of The Year.

Breaux also coaches the Dickinson men's golf team, a perennial Centennial Conference powerhouse.

Head coaching record

Football

References

External links
 Dickinson profile

1955 births
Living people
Dickinson Red Devils football coaches
Dickinson Red Devils men's golf coaches
Gettysburg Bullets football coaches
Gettysburg Bullets men's golf coaches
Gettysburg Bullets wrestling coaches
West Chester Golden Rams football coaches
West Chester Golden Rams football players
West Chester Golden Rams golfers